Fort Irwin National Training Center (Fort Irwin NTC) is a major training area for the United States military in the Mojave Desert in northern San Bernardino County, California.

The National Training Center is part of the US Army Forces Command (FORSCOM). The opposing force at the National Training Center is the 11th Armored Cavalry Regiment, the Blackhorse Cavalry, who are stationed at the base to provide an opposing force to units on a training rotation at Fort Irwin. In September 2017, a state-of-the-art hospital was opened that provides healthcare services to the Fort Irwin beneficiaries.

Fort Irwin works within the R-2502 Special Use Airspace Complex.

History
The Fort Irwin area has a history dating back almost 15,000 years, when Native Americans of the Lake Mojave Period were believed to live in the area. Native American settlements and pioneer explorations in the area were first recorded when the Spanish missionary Padre Francisco Garces traveled the Mohave Trail with Mohave Indian guides in 1776. During his travels, he noted several small bands of Indians, and is believed to have been the first European to make contact with the Native Americans of the area.

Jedediah Smith is thought to have been the first European American to explore the area in 1826. A fur trapper, Smith was soon followed by other pioneers traveling the Old Spanish Trail between Santa Fe and Los Angeles. The trail crossed the area on the eastern edge of Fort Irwin, between Salt Spring and the Mojave River. The Old Spanish Trail passed through Silurian Valley, then west through the Avawatz Mountains at Red Pass and beyond the playa of Red Pass Lake, through a gap between the Soda and Tiefort Mountains to Bitter Spring in a wash in the next valley. Bitter Spring was the only reliable watering and grazing place along the route.

In 1844, Captain John C. Fremont, accompanied by Kit Carson, was the first member of the US Army to visit the Fort Irwin area. Captain Fremont established a camp near Bitter Springs as he pioneered a route that served travelers on the Old Spanish Trail, and later the Mormon Road, linking Salt Lake City to California. This camp was later to become an important water and grazing place for pioneers crossing the Mojave Desert during California's settlement and gold rush.

The California Gold Rush brought prosperous trade and unexpected trouble to the area. As California grew, and more travelers and freighters used the Mormon Road to cross the territory between California and Utah, raids and horse stealing became a problem. In 1847, the Army's Mormon Battalion patrolled the Fort Irwin area to control the raiding and horse stealing.  By 1855 it became part of the route of the freight wagon road between Los Angeles and Salt Lake City.   During the Bitter Spring Expedition in 1860 the Army constructed Camp Bitter Springs, a small stone fort overlooking Bitter Spring and patrolled the Fort Irwin area.

In the 1880s the area experienced an economic boom with the discovery of borax at Death Valley. From the late 19th century to the early 20th century, the area began to grow tremendously as mining operations of all types flourished. Soon railroads, workers, and businesses led to the establishment of the nearby town of Barstow.

The years following the Indian Wars were quiet militarily. In 1942, the Mojave Anti-Aircraft Range was renamed Camp Irwin, in honor of Major General George LeRoy Irwin, commander of the 57th Field Artillery Brigade during World War I, and it was subsumed into the Desert Training Center as one of its cantonment areas and some of its ranges. Two years later, Camp Irwin was deactivated and placed on surplus status.

Camp Irwin reopened its gates in 1951 as the Armored Combat Training Area and served as a training center for combat units during the Korean War. Regimental tank companies of the U.S. 43d Infantry Division from Camp Pickett, Virginia were the first to train at the new facility.

The garrison was designated a permanent installation on 1 August 1961 and renamed Fort Irwin. During the Vietnam buildup, many units, primarily artillery and engineer, trained and deployed from Fort Irwin.

In January 1971, the garrison was deactivated again and placed in maintenance status under the control of Fort MacArthur (Los Angeles), California. The California National Guard assumed responsibility for the garrison and from 1972 to 1980, Fort Irwin was used primarily as a training area by Army National Guard and U.S. Army Reserve units.

National Training Center

On 9 August 1979, the Department of the Army announced that Fort Irwin had been selected as National Training Center (NTC). The location – an isolated area – was ideal because of its over  capacity for maneuver and ranges, its uncluttered electromagnetic spectrum, and its restricted airspace. The National Training Center was officially activated 16 October 1980, and Fort Irwin was transferred from the California Army National Guard back to the Regular Army returning into active status on 1 July 1981.

The NTC was unique in its training approach in the use of Real Time Location System (originally a General Dynamics microwave transponder system; later replaced by GPS); the use of lasers to simulate direct fire (including small arms); and the use of real time interactive computer models for indirect fire along with Air to Ground and Ground to Air missile systems.  Originally developed as a prototype by the US Army's Fort Hunter-Liggett with Systems and Software design the BDM, the NTC system was the first to augment After Action Reviews of training exercises with video and maneuver overlays including time stamped combat events.

Since its activation, the NTC has witnessed many other firsts. Among the first units to train against the Opposing Force (OPFOR) were 1st Battalion, 22nd Infantry and 1st Battalion 77th Armor, 4th Infantry Division (Mech) from Fort Carson, Colorado in Spring 1978 as a proof of concept FX for establishing Irwin as the NTC, the 3rd Battalion 67th Armor, 2nd Armored Division from Fort Hood, Texas in operation TASK FORCE IRWIN III, 1 Aug – 14 Sept, 1979, and 3rd Brigade, 1st Cavalry Division from Fort Hood, Texas in spring 1981.  Also Ft Irwin and the 1st CAV tested and implemented the Multiple Integrated Laser Engagement System (MILES). Infantry and armor units first augmented the Opposing Force in 1984 as a detachment of the 7th infantry Division, Fort Ord CA. June 1985 saw the first use of M1 Abrams tanks and later in the fall of 1985 saw the M2 Bradley fighting vehicles on the NTC battlefield. The first armored cav. squadron rotation occurred in November 1984. Units from the 101st Airborne Division participated in the first light force rotation in March 1985. The 197th Infantry Brigade participated in the first extended rotation with brigade operations in June 1985. The first combined Light/Mechanized Infantry rotation took place in February 1990; the 7th Infantry Division (Light) from Fort Ord and the 24th Infantry Division (Mechanized) from Fort Stewart, Georgia participated. The first MOUT (Military Operations in Urban Terrain) mission was conducted at the NTC Pioneer Training Facility in December 1993.

Opposing Forces (OPFOR)
During the re-opening of the NTC in 1980, the OPFOR consisted of re-activation of the 6th Battalion, 31st Infantry, "The Polar Bears," from the 7th Infantry Division, based in Fort Ord, California, and the 1st Battalion, 73rd Armor. Once the US Army turned to regimental units in 1985, the OPFOR was redesignated the 177th Armored Brigade (SEP). The OPFOR soldiers were dressed in Soviet-style armor uniforms including black berets, Soviet-style insignias, and used M551 Sheridans visually modified to resemble BMP-1 vehicles and T-72 tanks. In their OPFOR role the Infantry Battalion was designated as the 32nd Guards Motorized Rifle Regiment. U.S. Marine Corps (USMC), U.S. Army Reserve and Army National Guard units would support infantry roles for the OPFOR.

Air support and air combat tactics came from USAF fighter wings operating from Nellis AFB and George AFB. USN strike squadrons from NAS Lemoore, USMC fighter/attack squadrons operating from MCAS El Toro, and USMC helicopter attack squadrons operating from MCAS Tustin. When George AFB, MCAS El Toro and MCAS Tustin were closed as a result of Base Realignment and Closure Commission actions in the 1990s, USAF air support shifted to composite fighter wings from Nellis AFB, Hill AFB, Luke AFB and Davis-Monthan AFB. USMC air support shifted to MCAS Miramar (formerly NAS Miramar), MCAS Yuma and MCAS Camp Pendleton.

During the 1980s and 1990s, the NTC also showcased US Army large-scale tactics to foreign military leaders from all over the world. The OPFOR ran 15 training rotations a year against armored brigades from both Active and Reserve Component US Army units from all over the United States. The command centers of these large-scale battles were computerized in a central command post, where each battle was recorded and analyzed. The results were subsequently debriefed to the participants.

After the September 11, 2001 attacks, the NTC transformed to focus on continuous counterinsurgency ops that reflected a rapidly changing battlefield, especially in desert climate environments.

Following the United States withdraw from Afghanistan in 2021 and the Russian invasion of Ukraine in early 2022, The National Training Center began to train Soldiers for future fights against major near-peer adversaries.

Description
The Post is composed of the Fort Irwin garrison with general support facilities such as:
 Post Emergency Services 
 Public Affairs Service
 Veterinary Service
 Housing, Financial, Admin and Community Services
 Religious Support and Social Services
 Human Resources and Civilian Personnel Services
 Environmental and Safety Office
 Public Works

The National Training Center element of the Post which consists of the following units:
 11th Armored Cavalry Regiment (Blackhorse) acting as the 'enemy' for all training visiting units.
 916th Support Brigade providing support to the installation, and sustainment for visiting units and their operations.
 The National Training Center (NTC) Operations Group which is responsible for all live training events.
 The Joint Center of Excellence is facilitating individual, collective and unit counter IED training; evaluating existing and developing new operational techniques, tactical procedures and counter IED equipment concepts.
 The Mission and Installation Contracting Command is responsible for the maintenance and logistics of all NTC and garrison facilities. 
 The Reserve Component Operations Plans and Training (RCOPT) facilitates integration of all reserve component formations at the NTC. It also serves as the NTC Command Group's advisor on all reserve component matters and educates all reserve units.

The NTC at Fort Irwin continues to serve as one of the US Army's main training centers. All US military services, as well as other government agencies and some foreign military units train at the NTC. A common tradition for any visiting military unit is to paint their sign on one of the rock formations near the main gate. Units of all types and locations are represented.

NTC training is not easy. The exercises incorporate complex scenarios exposing the units to detailed hybrid threats. Facing a strong opposing force and an insurgent force, at the same time, they must assist local people in towns and villages in the area in any way possible.

One of the NTC features is the presence of 12 mock-up "villages" used to train troops in Military Operations in Urban Terrain (MOUT) prior to their deployment. These villages have religious sites, hotels, traffic circles, etc. filled with foreign 'locals'. These are Arabic speaking roleplaying actors portraying government officials, local militia, police, military, villagers, street vendors and insurgents. They will confront the military with all kinds of all-day problems.

The largest two villages are known as Razish and Ujen, the closest located about 30 minutes from the main part of the post. The largest village consists of 585 buildings that can engage an entire brigade combat team into a fight. The training uses simulated as well as live Unmanned Aircraft Systems (UAS), the Multiple Integrated Laser Engagement System (MILES) and incorporates multi-national forces and (social) media actions.

Observer, Controller and Trainers (OCTs) are embedded with the training units from brigade down to platoon level. Some villages are completely instrumented, including video recording, to assist the OC/T teams in providing feedback to the training unit.

Geography
Fort Irwin has a total area of 2,579.77 km2 (996.055 sq mi), with only 0.3277 km2 of this area as water, according to the United States Census Bureau, however the CDP covers an area of 7.1 square miles (18.3 km2), all of it land.

Within its territory on its western side lies the Goldstone Deep Space Communications Complex. The ZIP Code is 92310, and the reservation is inside area codes 442 and 760.

Climate
According to the Köppen Climate Classification system, Fort Irwin has a cold desert climates, abbreviated "BWk" on climate maps.

Demographics

The United States Census Bureau has designated Fort Irwin as a separate census-designated place (CDP) for statistical purposes, covering the residential population. Per the 2020 census, the population was 8,096.

2020 census

Note: the US Census treats Hispanic/Latino as an ethnic category. This table excludes Latinos from the racial categories and assigns them to a separate category. Hispanics/Latinos can be of any race.

2010 census
The 2010 United States Census reported that the Fort Irwin Census Designated Place had a population of 8,845. The population density was 1,254.1 people per square mile (484.2/km2). The racial makeup of Fort Irwin was 5,481 (62.0%) White (51.6% Non-Hispanic White), 1,086 (12.3%) African American, 103 (1.2%) Native American, 402 (4.5%) Asian, 120 (1.4%) Pacific Islander, 916 (10.4%) from other races, and 737 (8.3%) from two or more races. Hispanic or Latino of any race were 2,261 persons (25.6%).

The census reported that 7,507 people (84.9% of the population) lived in households, 1,338 (15.1%) lived in non-institutionalized group quarters, and 0 (0%) were institutionalized.

There were 2,371 households, out of which 1,532 (64.6%) had children under the age of 18 living in them, 1,903 (80.3%) were opposite-sex married couples living together, 133 (5.6%) had a female householder with no husband present, 54 (2.3%) had a male householder with no wife present. There were 13 (0.5%) unmarried opposite-sex partnerships, and 15 (0.6%) same-sex married couples or partnerships. 244 households (10.3%) were made up of individuals, and 3 (0.1%) had someone living alone who was 65 years of age or older. The average household size was 3.17. There were 2,090 families (88.1% of all households); the average family size was 3.41.

The population was spread out, with 2,992 people (33.8%) under the age of 18, 1,888 people (21.3%) aged 18 to 24, 3,727 people (42.1%) aged 25 to 44, 224 people (2.5%) aged 45 to 64, and 14 people (0.2%) who were 65 years of age or older. The median age was 23.9 years. For every 100 females, there were 132.1 males. For every 100 females age 18 and over, there were 147.9 males.

There were 2,487 housing units at an average density of 352.6 per square mile (136.1/km2), of which 18 (0.8%) were owner-occupied, and 2,353 (99.2%) were occupied by renters. The homeowner vacancy rate was 0%; the rental vacancy rate was 4.3%. 71 people (0.8% of the population) lived in owner-occupied housing units and 7,436 people (84.1%) lived in rental housing units.

According to the 2010 United States census, Fort Irwin had a median household income of $50,469, with 12.6% of the population living below the federal poverty line.

Infrastructure

Fort Irwin Solar Project 
The Fort Irwin Solar Project, launched in 2009, will be the largest renewable energy project in the DoD's history. This plan is expected to result in more than 500 MW of renewable energy with one billion kilowatt-hours (kWh) of solar power generated per year by 2022.

Points of interest
 The remains of the Epsom Salts Monorail are close by.

In popular culture
 Some scenes of the 1979 Miloš Forman musical war comedy drama Hair were filmed at Fort Irwin.
 Some action, including a critical dramatic scene of tank shooting, takes place at Fort Irwin in Lee Child's novel The Enemy.
 Parts of the 2021 Drama A Journal for Jordan were filmed at Fort Irwin.

See also
 Joint Readiness Training Center (JRTC)
 Joint Multinational Readiness Center (JMRC)

References

External links

 The NTC and Fort Irwin
 GlobalSecurity.org article
 'Fighting insurgents in Baghdad USA' The Sunday Times. 2008-10-5. Retrieved on 2009-02-16

Irwin
Irwin
Military facilities in the Mojave Desert
Military in San Bernardino County, California
United States Army Training and Doctrine Command
Census-designated places in San Bernardino County, California
Populated places in the Mojave Desert
1940 establishments in California
Military installations established in 1940